Mecodema moniliferum is a medium-sized ground beetle endemic to the South island, New Zealand. This species is part of the monophyletic curvidens group and is found on the braided-river systems of the South Island.

Diagnosis 
Distinguished from other Mecodema species by having:

 ventrites 4–5 bearing numerous setose punctures;
 elytral striae defined anteriorly and laterally by large, irregularly spaced asetose punctures;
 shape of basal lobe and setal distribution along ventral edge of left paramere.

Description 
Length 14.6–19.5 mm, pronotal width 4.2–6.2 mm, elytral width 5.1–7.1 mm. Colour of entire body matte reddish-brown to matte black.

Natural history 
One of the three Mecodema species that is adapted to inhabiting the braided-river systems of Canterbury and Otago, South Island.

References 

Beetles described in 1867
Beetles of New Zealand
moniliferum